Palmitoleic acid, or (9Z)-hexadec-9-enoic acid, is an omega-7 monounsaturated fatty acid (16:1n-7) with the formula CH3(CH2)5CH=CH(CH2)7COOH that is a common constituent of the glycerides of human adipose tissue.  It is present in all tissues but, in general, found in higher concentrations in the liver. It is biosynthesized from palmitic acid by the action of the enzyme Stearoyl-CoA desaturase-1. 

Animal and cell culture studies indicate that palmitoleic acid is anti-inflammatory, and improves insulin sensitivity in liver and skeletal muscles, but more studies are required to establish its actions in humans. Many of the effects of palmitoleic acid are due to its activation of PPAR-alpha.

Dietary sources
Palmitoleic acid can be abbreviated as 16:1∆9. Dietary sources of palmitoleic acid include breast milk, a variety of animal fats, vegetable oils, and marine oils.  Macadamia oil (Macadamia integrifolia)  and sea buckthorn oil (Hippophae rhamnoides) are botanical sources with high concentrations, containing 17% and 19-29% palmitoleic acid, respectively.

References

Alkenoic acids
Fatty acids